Kokhlatskoye is a rural locality (a selo) in Chergalinsky Selsoviet of Romnensky District, Amur Oblast, Russia. The population was 36 as of 2018. There are 3 streets.

Geography 
Kokhlatskoye is located 25 km north of Romny (the district's administrative centre) by road. Chergali is the nearest rural locality.

References 

Rural localities in Romnensky District